Eptalofos is a village and a community of the Delphi municipality. Before the 2011 local government reform it was a part of the municipality of Parnassos, of which it was a municipal district. The 2011 census recorded 461 residents in the village and 470 residents in the community. The community of Eptalofos covers an area of 32.796 km2.

Administrative division
The community of Eptalofos consists of four separate settlements: 
Alataries (population 4)
Eptalofos (population 461)
Itamos (uninhabited)
Zampeios (population 5)
The aforementioned population figures are as of 2011.

Population
According to the 2011 census, the population of the settlement of Eptalofos was 461 people, an increase of almost 14% compared to the previous census of 2001.

See also
 List of settlements in Phocis

References

External links

Populated places in Phocis
Villages in Greece
Mount Parnassus